Heat (stylized as "ЖАRА") is a 2006 Russian teen romantic comedy loosely based on the Walking the Streets of Moscow, directed by  and produced by Fyodor Bondarchuk. Heat along with Wolfhound became one of the most expensive Russian films in 2006. Additionally, its budget was one third as compared to the advertising campaign.

Plot
After three years a conscript sailor in the Russian Navy, Aleksey (Aleksey Chadov), comes back from the Black Sea Fleet to Moscow for a meeting with his waiting girlfriend, Masha, and old classmates. Unfortunately, he finds out that his girlfriend is already married and has a child, then decides to spend the remaining time in a restaurant with his friends—an oligarch's son, Konstantin (Konstantin Kryukov), a beginner actor, Artur (Artur Smolyaninov), and a hip-hop artist, Timati. When their lunch is coming to the end, it appears that no one has money to pay the bill, except Konstantin's dollars which do not accept for payment. The rapper is decided to exchange currency at the nearest money changer, that will cause troubles.

As the former changer belongs to the Armenian (Tigran Keosayan), Timati sets out in search of another, but runs against a neo-Nazi skinhead gang. Saving his own life, the hero hides in the Konstantin's flat, where an Ostap Bender-like swindler, Dani, in waiting him. Meanwhile, his friends cannot wait anymore, so Artur is sent off. But before he could change the money, he is allured by the film director (Fyodor Bondarchuk) and prepares for shooting, but misses the actor-bus and leaves with gastarbeiters to demolish the Rossiya Hotel. Eventually, Konstantin hands over his last dollars to Aleksey, but he also failed after falling in love with a young traffic victim, Nastya. After all that, despaired Konstantin makes a fuss in the restaurant, as a result he gets jailed by the police. Luckily for him, the mates could not abandon their friend and rescue him from captivity.

Cast
Aleksey Chadov — Alexey
Artur Smolyaninov — Arthur
Konstantin Kryukov — Kostya
Timati — Timati
Anastasia Kochetkova — girl with camera
Agnia Ditkovskyte — Nastia
Dani Dadaev — Deni
Maria Kurkova — Masha (Alexey's ex-girlfriend)
Ptakha — husband of Masha
Mikhail Vladimirov — manager of cafe
Irina Rahmanova — waitress
Igor Vernik — employee of the film studio
Tigran Keosayan — flower seller
Rezo Gigineishvili — director
Fyodor Bondarchuk — director
Tatyana Lyutaeva — Alexei's mother

Production
Gigineishvili and Bondarchuk used the same young cast and crew from The 9th Company for their film, set in Moscow during a hot boiling summer, which caused as the title Heat instead of the draft entitled "City Tales" ("Сказки города"). Its filming took place in the shortest time period: "the script was written in ten days; pre-production took no more than two weeks; and after four months of shooting, the movie was done."

Reception

Despite the fiscal success, Heat took in $15 million in the CIS, and about $1 million in Ukraine, the film, mainly, received disapproving responses of critics for the commercial direction. According to the e-poll of Moskovskij Komsomolets, Heat was recognized as the worst Russian film of 2006.

Awards and nominations

Censorship in Ukraine
During the Russo-Ukrainian War, the Boycott Russian Films activists demanded the Ukrainian Government to ban Russian films in Ukraine after the Donetsk Airport incident with Mikhail Porechenkov. On 31 November 2014, the State Agency of Ukraine for Cinema, on the proposal of the Ministry of Culture of Ukraine and the Security Service of Ukraine, forbidden to display 69 Russian films and TV series with Mikhail Porechenkov, including the film Heat.

Soundtrack

Track listing
"Когда ты плачешь" - TOKiO 4:15
"Летняя Москва" - Karina Koks 3:42
"Город ночных фонарей" - Timati &  3:21
"Жара" - Timati, F. Bondarchuk, NASTY 4:21
"В городской суете" - Basta 3:55
"Жара 77" - Centr 4:03
"Детка" - Timati 4:24
"Всё между нами" -  4:14
"The Girl of funk" - DJ Smash 2:26
"Groovin" - VIP77 4:11
"Black star" - Timati 4:57
"Лето"	- Lomonosov (band) 4:17
"Москва" - VIP77 3:33
"Жара"	- DJ Smash 3:10
"Where you gonna be" - VIP77 4:15
"Happy New Year" - Siberia (band) 3:23

References
Footnotes

Notes

External links
 

2006 films
2006 romantic comedy films
2000s Russian-language films
2000s teen comedy films
Russian romantic comedy films
Russian teen comedy films
Films produced by Fyodor Bondarchuk